"Gott sein" (German for "To be God") is the first single by German metal band Megaherz, and is from their first album, Wer bist du?. The song, considered one of their most famous, was re-recorded as "Gott sein '04" for their 2004 album 5.

Track listing 

 "Gott sein (Radio Edit)"
 "Gott sein (Blemish's Buss & Bet Mix)"
 "Gott sein (Take off Mix)"
 "Gott sein (Blemish's auf die Mütz Mix)"

1997 singles
Megaherz songs
Song articles with missing songwriters
1997 songs